The Doink Years is an album released by The Grifters in 1996.

The Grifters, on the verge of releasing their first major label album on Sub Pop 1996, Shangri-La Records re-issued the first two self-released Grifters 7" singles as a 10", with a single per side and featuring a bonus track recorded in the same era. Though the vinyl version only Disfigurehead & the Kingdom of Jones, but known as The Doink Years because the original singles were released under the same Doink Records banner as their A Band Called Bud debut, Dad. The song "Snake Oil" features the debut of Stan Gallimore on drums, establishing the Grifters as four-piece for the rest of their career.

Re-issues

10" track listing
Side A: Disfigurehead 7"
"Disfigurehead" - 3:18 (vocals Shouse)
"Need You" - 3:48 (vocals Taylor)
"Reason Enough" - 1:36 (vocals Shouse)
"How Long?" - 3:49 (vocals Taylor)
"Kicking"* - 5:22 (vocals Shouse)

Side b: The Kingdom Of Jones 7"
"Encrusted" - 3:38 (vocals Shouse)
"Another Song" - 3:45 (vocals Taylor)
"Snake Oil" - 5:16  (vocals Taylor)
"Daydream Riot" - 3:37 (vocals Shouse)

The Disfigurehead side features a rough bonus track titled "Kicking" and features the words "Long Live Doink" etched in the dead vinyl. The Kingdom of Jones side reads, "When You Least Expect It, Expect It", and the original 7" art is reproduced on either side of the sleeve.

CD track listing
"Disfigurehead" – 3:18 (vocals Shouse)
"Need You" – 3:48 (vocals Taylor)
"Reason Enough" – 1:36 (vocals Shouse)
"How Long?" – 3:49 (vocals Taylor)
"Encrusted" – 3:38 (vocals Shouse)
"Another Song" – 3:45 (vocals Taylor)
"Snake Oil" – 5:16  (vocals Taylor)
"Daydream Riot" – 3:37 (vocals Shouse)
"Kicking"* – 5:22 (vocals Shouse)

Album credits

Grifters
 Stan Gallimore
 Tripp Lamkins
 David Shouse
 Scott Taylor

Additional credits
 The Kingdom of Jones artwork by Greg Harwell
 Disfigurehead photo and design by David Shouse

Grifters (band) albums
1996 compilation albums